Associazione Sportiva Dilettantistica Bojano is an Italian association football club located in Bojano, Molise.

History
It played 2008–09 in Eccellenza Molise, which they won, therefore assuring promotion back to Serie D after their relegation in 2007–08. In the season 2010–11, from Serie D group F relegated and so back to Eccellenza Molise.
The team returned to Serie D after winning Eccellenza Molise in 2012–13 season. In the 2013–14 Serie D season it was excluded by the LND after 29 match days for refusing to play four games. It was subsequently admitted to Prima Categoria Molisana in August 2014.

During their 2007–08 campaign, Zdenek Zeman's son Karel served as head coach for the club.

Colors and Badge
Its colors are white and red.

References

External links
 Official homepage

Football clubs in Molise
Association football clubs established in 1962
Italian football clubs established in 1962